Gary Butler (born November 13, 1984) is a professional American football linebacker who is currently a free agent. He was signed by the Philadelphia Eagles as an undrafted free agent in 2008. He played college football for the California Vulcans.

Professional career

BC Lions
Butler signed with the BC Lions of the Canadian Football League in May 2009 and appeared in the first eight 2009 BC Lions season regular games before being released on September 1, 2009.

Pittsburgh Power
Butler played in 2011 and 2013 for the AFL's Pittsburgh Power.

Cleveland Gladiators
On April 8, 2014, Butler was assigned to the Cleveland Gladiators. On June 3, 2014, Butler was reassigned by the Gladiators. On June 5, 2014, Butler was again assigned to the Gladiators.

References

External links
BC Lions bio

1984 births
Living people
Players of American football from Pittsburgh
Players of Canadian football from Pittsburgh
American players of Canadian football
American football defensive linemen
Canadian football defensive linemen
California Vulcans football players
Philadelphia Eagles players
BC Lions players
Pittsburgh Power players
Cleveland Gladiators players